Ferdie Harvey (born 16 December 1936) is a Jamaican cricketer. He played nine first-class matches for Jamaica between 1959 and 1967.

References

External links
 

1936 births
Living people
Jamaican cricketers
Jamaica cricketers
Sportspeople from Kingston, Jamaica